Joan Whincup is a New Zealand non-fiction writer. The book Akekeia! Traditional Dance in Kiribati, which she co-authored with Tony Whincup, won an Ockham New Zealand Book Award in 2002.

Biography 
Whincup was born in the United Kingdom. She and her husband Tony Whincup lived in Uganda for a time, then in 1976 moved to Kiribati. In 1984 the couple moved to New Zealand.

In 2002, the Whincups' book on traditional dance in Kiribati won the illustrative book category in the Ockham New Zealand Book Awards.

Publications 
 Whincup, J., & Arawatau (1981). Te Katake. Tarawa: Ministry of Education, Training and Culture, Kiribati.
 Whincup, T., & Whincup, J. (2001). Akekeia!: Traditional dance in Kiribati. Wellington: Tony and Joan Whincup.

References

New Zealand non-fiction writers
Living people
Year of birth missing (living people)
New Zealand women writers